Yongsan-dong can refer to several administrative wards in South Korean cities

Yongsan-dong in Yongsan-gu, Seoul
Yongsan-dong in Dong-gu, Gwangju
Yongsan-dong in Yuseong-gu, Daejeon
Yongsan-dong in Chungju, Chungcheongbuk-do
Yongsan-dong in Naju, Jeollanam-do